Nathalie Hervé (born 28 March 1963) is a French former ice dancer. With Pierre Béchu, Hervé became a five-time French national champion, from 1980 to 1984. They placed eighth at the 1981 World Championships, fifth at the 1983 European Championships, and 14th at the 1984 Winter Olympics.

In August 1988, Hervé and Béchu were traveling with their daughter, Johanna, when their vehicle collided with another, killing Béchu and Johanna.

Results

With Béchu

With Husarek

References

1963 births
Living people
French female ice dancers
Olympic figure skaters of France
Figure skaters at the 1984 Winter Olympics
Sportspeople from Troyes
20th-century French women